Dope Smugglaz were a musical group of the 1990s. Made up of Keith Binner, Chico Ijomanta and Tim Sheridan they performed electronic music. They scored two UK chart successes, "The Word" which reached number 62 in 1998 and "Double Double Dutch" which sampled Malcolm McLaren's "Double Dutch" and reached 15 in August 1999. In 1999, Dope Smugglaz appeared at the number 96 spot at the DJ Mag Top 100 DJs list.

References

English electronic music groups
Remixers